Invincible is the third studio album by American Christian rock band Skillet. It was released on February 1, 2000 from ForeFront Records and Ardent Records. This album continues the electronic rock that was heard on their previous releases but marks the exit of original guitarist, Ken Steorts, and the entrance of his replacement, Kevin Haaland on guitar, as well as John Cooper's wife Korey on keyboards, loops, sampling and programming.

Track listing
All songs written by John L. Cooper, except where noted.

The final track, "You're in My Brain", contains a hidden song called "Angels Fall Down".

Personnel 
Skillet
 John L. Cooper – vocals, keyboards, guitars bass guitar, loops
 Korey Cooper – keyboards, programming, loops, sampling, backing vocals
 Kevin Haaland – guitars
 Trey McClurklin – drums

Additional musicians
 Skidd Mills – guitars, additional loops 
 Tim Palmer – guitars 
 Mike Salopek – guitars 
 Kent Smith – guitars 
 Ken Steorts – guitars 
 Matt Browning – additional loops (3, 11)

Production
 Dana Key – executive producer 
 Patrick Scholes – executive producer 
 John Cooper – producer 
 Skidd Mills – producer, engineer, mixing 
 Jason Latshaw – assistant engineer
 Matt Martone – assistant engineer
 Pete Matthews – assistant engineer
 Brad Blackwood – digital editing 
 Scott Hull – mastering at Classic Sound (New York, NY)
 Disciple Design – art direction, design
 Allen Clark – photography 
 R.W. Management – management

Music video

There was a music video made for the song "Best Kept Secret". It was the first video by the band to have a story of some kind in it, though the story is very brief. Some of the video shows the band in the story portion in futuristic clothing, while the rest of it shows them playing in a room in similar clothing. The story portion shows the band entering a hallway, which they walk along until they come to a massive room where prisoners are being held in glass cells. All of the prisoners appear to be asleep, with gas masks over their faces. Each band member takes a pipe, at which point all of the prisoners wake up, and the band then smashes the glass of the cells. All of the prisoners fall out of the cells and onto the floor. The band helps them all up as they remove their masks. After freeing the prisoners, the band exits the way they came in.

Chart performance

In 2000, Invincible peaked at No. 13 on the Billboard Christian Albums chart.

References

 Invincible. (2000) Ardent/ForeFront FFD5243

Skillet (band) albums
ForeFront Records albums
2000 albums

pt:Invincible#Álbuns